Haplotrema concavum, the gray-footed lancetooth, is a species of predatory air-breathing land snail, a terrestrial pulmonate gastropod mollusk in the family Haplotrematidae.

Distribution
The snail is native to the humid hardwood forests of eastern North America, from Southern Canada and the Great Lakes region, south through the Midwestern U.S. including eastern Nebraska and Oklahoma, and through the Southeastern United States, including the Gulf States. It is found along the Apalachicola River in western Florida and Georgia.

Haplotrema concavum is found living in leaf litter near the base of trees, or under rotting logs.

Feeding habits 
Haplotrema concavum is a carnivorous species. It is known to be a predator, for example, of Patera clarki nantahala.

Parasites 
Parasites of Haplotrema concavum include:
 Parelaphostrongylus tenuis

References

External links

 Univ. of Florida: Featured Creatures website — Haplotrema concavum  — UF Institute of Food and Agricultural Sciences-IFAS.

Haplotrematidae
Molluscs of North America
Fauna of the Eastern United States
Fauna of the Great Lakes region (North America)
Fauna of the Southeastern United States
Gastropods described in 1821